Coral-billed scimitar babbler has been split into two species
 Black-crowned scimitar babbler, Pomatorhinus ferruginosus
 Brown-crowned scimitar babbler, Pomatorhinus phayrei

Birds by common name